Otisco Township may refer to the following places in the United States:

 Otisco Township, Michigan
 Otisco Township, Waseca County, Minnesota

	

Township name disambiguation pages